The orderly room sergeant (ORS) or orderly room quartermaster sergeant (ORQMS) is the chief clerk of an infantry battalion in the British Army, assisting the adjutant. The former appointment is held if the chief clerk holds the rank of colour sergeant and the latter if he holds the rank of warrant officer class 2.

Orderly room sergeant is the most senior colour sergeant appointment in a battalion. ORQMS is the third most senior WO2 appointment in a battalion after the regimental quartermaster sergeant and the technical quartermaster sergeant.

References

Military appointments of the British Army